Brickellia scoparia is a Mesoamerican species of flowering plants in the family Asteraceae. It is native to Guatemala and to Mexico as far north as Nayarit.

References

External links
photo of herbarium specimen at Missouri Botanical Garden, collected in México State

scoparia
Flora of Guatemala
Flora of Mexico
Plants described in 1836